The Battle of Jilehoy was a battle between the Russian Empire and Circassia in 1787.

Battle 
The Russians decided to make a grand attack in 1787. This resulted in the Battle of Jilehoy. At first, the Russians were losing, but they won after additional forces arrived. After winning the battle, the Russian army raided the Abaza, Besleney, Chemguy and Hatuqway regions and burned near a hundred villages. In 1788, the Russians besieged the Bighurqal (Anapa) castle, but failed.

References 

Jilehoy
1787 in the Russian Empire
Caucasian War
1787 in military history
Jilehoy